The Daingerfield church shooting was a mass murder that occurred at the First Baptist Church in Daingerfield, Texas, United States on June 22, 1980.  Alvin Lee King III, 45, a former high school teacher, armed with a scoped, semi-automatic AR-15-type derivative, an M1 carbine, and two revolvers, killed five people and wounded 10 others, after members of the church had declined his request to appear as character witnesses in a trial in which he was charged with raping his daughter. King was arrested after shooting himself and charged with five counts of murder and ten counts of attempted murder, but committed suicide in his prison cell on January 19, 1982, before he could be tried.

Victims
 Gene Gandy, 50
 Gina Linam, 7
 J.Y. "Red" McDaniel, 49
 Thelma Richardson, 78
 Kenneth Truitt, 49

Additionally, Arthur Greaves, 69, Robert Jack Dean, 56, and Laverne McDaniel were injured during the shooting.

In popular culture
Faith Under Fire (2012)

Law & Order, Season 1, Episode 18 - "The Secret Sharers" (1991)

See also
 List of shootings in Texas
 Sutherland Springs church shooting

References

External links
How A Small Texas Town Coped With A 1980 Church Shooting (HBO)
1980 Church Shooting In Daingerfield, TX | Jay Gormley
35th anniversary of Daingerfield church shooting
Survivors reflects on Daingerfield church shooting 40 years later
Laverne McDaniel Interview-Daingerfield church shooting 1980
Shattered Sanctuary
Daingerfield knows church's pain after shooting
Two Texas Churches, Linked by Tragedy Amid the Pews
NEVER FORGOTTEN: Survivors reflect on Daingerfield church shooting 40 years later
1980 Daingerfield Church shooting
Targeting faith

1980 in Texas
Mass murder in Texas
Mass murder in 1980
1980 murders in the United States
1980 mass shootings in the United States
Deaths by firearm in Texas
Crimes in Texas
Morris County, Texas
June 1980 crimes
June 1980 events in the United States
Mass shootings in Texas
Mass shootings in the United States
Attacks on religious buildings and structures in the United States
Attacks on churches in North America